Colleen Ann Sheehan (born January 7, 1956) is a former Republican member of the Pennsylvania House of Representatives.

References

Republican Party members of the Pennsylvania House of Representatives
Women state legislators in Pennsylvania
Living people
1956 births
21st-century American women